197th may refer to:

197th (Lancashire Fusiliers) Brigade, formation of the British Army during the First World War
197th Air Refueling Squadron, unit of the Arizona Air National Guard 161st Air Refueling Wing
197th Battalion (Vikings of Canada), CEF, unit in the Canadian Expeditionary Force during the First World War
197th Division (People's Republic of China), military formation of the Chinese People's Volunteer Army
197th Field Artillery Regiment, regiment in the New Hampshire Army National Guard
197th Fires Brigade ("Concord Volunteers"), field artillery brigade of the New Hampshire Army National Guard
197th Infantry Brigade (United States) ("Sledgehammer"), Infantry brigade of the United States Army
197th Infantry Division (Wehrmacht), German division in World War II
197th Ohio Infantry (or 197th OVI), infantry regiment in the Union Army during the American Civil War
197th Street (Manhattan)
Pennsylvania's 197th Representative District
Ruby Junction/E 197th Avenue, MAX light rail station in Gresham, Oregon

See also
197 (number)
197, the year 197 (CXCVII) of the Julian calendar
197 BC